Nanumba North Municipal District is one of the sixteen districts in Northern Region, Ghana. Originally it was formerly part of the then-larger Nanumba District in 1988, until the southern part of the district was split off to create Nanumba South District on 27 August 2004; thus the remaining part has been renamed as Nanumba North District. However on 15 March 2018, it was later elevated to municipal district assembly status to become Nanumba North Municipal District. The municipality is located in the southern part of Northern Region and has Bimbilla as its capital town.

See also

References

Districts of the Northern Region (Ghana)